Duygu Yılmaz (born May 3, 1988) is a Turkish women's football goalkeeper, who plays in the Turkish Women's Super League for Fatih Karagümrük with jersey number 1. She was a member of the U-17, U-19 and Turkey women's national team.

Early years
Duygu Yılmaz was born to a footballer father in Keçiören district Ankara Province, Turkey on May 3, 1988. Her older sister played also football.

Playing career

Club

Yılmaz obtained her license for Gazi Üniversitesispor in her hometown on March 4, 2003. She began her career in the forward position. However, she accepted her trainers suggestion to play the goalkeeper from then on due to her good reflex she exposed during a training as she was keping the goal. After playing two full seasons between 2008 and 2010, she transferred to the Istanbul-based Ataşehir Belediyespor. she enjoyed league champion title at the end of the 2009–10 season with Gazi Üniversitesispor.

She took part for Ataşehir Belediyespor at all three matches of the 2011–12 UEFA Women's Champions League.

In October 2018, she transferred to Kdz. Ereğlispor. 

In the 2020-21 Turkcell Women's Football League season, she joined Beşiktaş J.K. and enjoyed the champion title with her team. By October 2021, she transferred to the newly established Fatih Karagümrğk Women's.

International
Yılmaz was admitted to the Turkey girls' U-17 team, and debuted in the friendly match against Belgium on January 31, 2008.

She was a member of the Turkey women's U-19 team, and took part at three matches of the 2007 UEFA Championship First qualifying round. She capped in total 14 times for the national U-19 team.

She played her first match with the Turkey women's national team on November 18, 2006, and participated in three matches of the UEFA Women's Euro 2009 qualifying, four  of the 2008 UEFA Support International Tournament, tw of the 2009 UEFA Support International Tournament, seven of the 2011 FIFA Women's World Cup qualification – UEFA Group 5 matches, and one of the UEFA Women's Euro 2013 qualifying – Group 2 match. She capped in 20 matches between 2006 and 2011.

Career statistics
.

Honours
 Turkish Women's First Football League
 Gazi Üniversitesispor
 Winners (1): 2009–10

 Ataşehir Belediyespor
 Winners (2): 2010–11, 2011–12, 2011–12
 Runners-up (4): 2012–13, 2013–14, 2014–15, 2015–16
 Third places (41): 2016–17

 Beşiktaş J.K.
  Winners (1): 2020–21

 Fatih Karagümrük S.K.
Runners-up: 2021-22

References

External links

 

Living people
1988 births
People from Keçiören
Footballers from Ankara
Women's association football goalkeepers
Turkish women's footballers
Turkey women's international footballers
Gazi Üniversitesispor players
Ataşehir Belediyespor players
Karadeniz Ereğlispor players
Beşiktaş J.K. women's football players
Fatih Karagümrük S.K. (women's football) players
Turkish Women's Football Super League players